Clostridium amylolyticum  is a Gram-positive, strictly anaerobic, mesophilic, amylolytic and rod-shaped bacterium from the genus Clostridium which has been isolated from UASB granules in China.

References

 

Bacteria described in 2008
amylolyticum